Lt. Stephanus Sebastian Leonard Steyn (10 November 1889 – 8 December 1917) was a Scottish-South African rugby union player and British Army officer who was killed in World War I.

Steyn was born in Moorreesburg, Cape Colony to Margaret Fraser Dobie Steyn of Dunbar and physician Gabriel Hendrik Steyn, who was a cousin of Martinus Theunis Steyn, President of the Orange Free State. Steyn was educated at Diocesan College, Rondebosch and University College, Oxford, where he studied medicine as a Rhodes scholar. He was part of the Oxford team that won a surprise victory over South Africa, reportedly owing to Steyn and fellow South African Lennox Broster's knowledge of Afrikaans, which helped them understood everything the rival team was saying. He continued his medical training at Guy's Hospital in London.

He was killed on 8 December 1917, aged 28, while serving with the Royal Field Artillery.  He is buried at the Jerusalem War Cemetery.

References

External links
 "An entire team wiped out by the Great War".  The Scotsman, 6 November 2009

1889 births
1917 deaths
Afrikaans-speaking people
Alumni of University College, Oxford
British Army personnel of World War I
British military personnel killed in World War I
Royal Field Artillery officers
Rugby union players from Moorreesburg
Scotland international rugby union players
Scottish people of Dutch descent
Scottish rugby union players
South African people of Scottish descent
South African Rhodes Scholars
South African rugby union players